Wilhide is a surname. Notable people with the surname include:

Elizabeth Wilhide, writer of books on design and decoration
Glenn Wilhide (born 1958), British television screenwriter and producer
Glenn Calvin Wilhide, design engineer for Black & Decker